Paducah is a home rule-class city in and the county seat of McCracken County, Kentucky, United States. The largest city in the Jackson Purchase region, it is located at the confluence of the Tennessee and the Ohio rivers, halfway between St. Louis, Missouri, to the northwest and Nashville, Tennessee, to the southeast. As of the 2020 census, the population was 27,137, up from 25,024 during the 2010 U.S. Census. Twenty blocks of the city's downtown have been designated as a historic district and listed on the National Register of Historic Places.

Paducah is the hub of its micropolitan area, which includes McCracken, Ballard and Livingston counties in Kentucky and Massac County in Illinois.

History

Early history

Paducah was first settled as "Pekin" around 1821 by European Americans James and William Pore. The town was laid out by explorer and surveyor William Clark in 1827 and renamed Paducah.

Although local lore long connected this name to an eponymous Chickasaw chief "Paduke" and his band of "Paducahs", authorities on the Chickasaw have since said that there was never any chief or tribe of that name, or anything like it. The Chickasaw language does not have related words. Instead, historians believe that Clark named the town for the Comanche people of the western plains. They were known by regional settlers as the Padoucas, from a Spanish transliteration of the Kaw word Pádoka or the Omaha Pádoⁿka.

Incorporation, steamboats and railroads

Paducah was formally established as a town in 1830 and incorporated as a city by the state legislature in 1838. By this time, steam boats traversed the river system, and its port facilities were important to trade and transportation. In addition, developing railroads began to enter the region. A factory for making red bricks, and a foundry for making rail and locomotive components became the nucleus of a thriving "River and Rail" economy.

Paducah became the site of dry dock facilities for steamboats and towboats, and thus headquarters for many barge companies. Because of its proximity to coalfields further to the east in Kentucky and north in Illinois, Paducah also became an important railway hub for the Illinois Central Railroad. This was the primary north-south railway connecting the industrial cities of Chicago and East St. Louis to the Gulf of Mexico at Gulfport, Mississippi, and New Orleans, Louisiana. The Illinois Central system also provided east-west links to the Burlington Northern and the Atchison, Topeka, and Santa Fe Railways (which later merged to become the BNSF Railway).

In 1924 the Illinois Central Railroad began construction at Paducah of their largest locomotive workshop in the nation. Over a period of 190 days, a large ravine between Washington and Jones streets was filled with 44,560 carloads of dirt to enlarge the site, sufficient for the construction of 23 buildings. The eleven million dollar project was completed in 1927 as the fourth-largest industrial plant in Kentucky. The railroad became the largest employer in Paducah, having 1,075 employees in 1938.

As steam locomotives were replaced through the 1940s and 1950s, the Paducah shops were converted to maintain diesel locomotives. A nationally known rebuilding program for aging diesel locomotives from Illinois Central and other railroads began in 1967. The shops became part of the Paducah and Louisville Railway in 1986. In the early 21st century, they are operated by VMV Paducahbilt.

Civil War

At the outset of the Civil War, Kentucky attempted to take a neutral position. However, when a Confederate force occupied Columbus, a Union force under General Ulysses S. Grant responded by occupying Paducah. Throughout most of the war, Col. Stephen G. Hicks was in charge of Paducah, and the town served as a massive supply depot for Federal forces along the Ohio, Mississippi, and Tennessee river systems.

On December 17, 1862, under the terms of General Order No. 11, US forces required 30 Jewish families to leave their long-established homes. Grant was trying to break up a black market in cotton, in which he suspected Jewish traders were involved. Cesar Kaskel, a prominent local Jewish businessman, dispatched a telegram of complaint to President Lincoln and met with him. As there were similar actions taken by other Jewish businessmen and loud complaints by Congress about the treatment of their constituents, Lincoln ordered the policy to be revoked within a few weeks.

On March 25, 1864, Confederate Gen. Nathan Bedford Forrest raided Paducah as part of his campaign northward from Mississippi into Western Tennessee and Kentucky. He intended to re-supply the Confederate forces in the region with recruits, ammunition, medical supplies, horses and mules, and especially to disrupt the Union domination of the regions south of the Ohio River. Known as the Battle of Paducah, the raid was successful in terms of the re-supply effort and in intimidating the Union, but Forrest returned south. According to his report, "I drove the enemy to their gunboats and fort; and held the city for ten hours, captured many stores and horses; burned sixty bales of cotton, one steamer, and a drydock, bringing out fifty prisoners."  Much of the fighting took place around Fort Anderson on the city's west side, in the present-day Lower Town neighborhood; most buildings in the neighborhood postdate the war, as most of the neighborhood was demolished soon after the battle to deny any future raids the advantage of surprise that they had enjoyed during the battle. Among the few houses that were not destroyed is the David Yeiser House, a single-story Greek Revival structure.

Later having read in the newspapers that 140 fine horses had escaped the raid, Forrest sent Brigadier General Abraham Buford back to Paducah, to get the horses and to keep Union forces busy there while he attacked Fort Pillow in Tennessee. His forces were charged with a massacre of United States Colored Troops among the Union forces whom they defeated at the fort. On April 14, 1864, Buford's men found the horses hidden in a Paducah foundry, as reported by the newspapers. Buford rejoined Forrest with the spoils, leaving the Union in control of Paducah until the end of the War.

1937 flood

In a far-reaching flood, on January 21, 1937, the Ohio River at Paducah rose above its 50-foot flood stage, cresting at 60.8 feet on February 2 and receding again to 50-feet on February 15. For nearly three weeks, 27,000 residents were forced to flee or to stay with friends and relatives in higher ground in McCracken or other counties. The American Red Cross and local churches provided some shelters. Buildings in downtown Paducah still bear historic plaques that define the high water marks.

Driven by 18 inches of rainfall in 16 days, along with sheets of swiftly moving ice, the Ohio River flood of 1937 was the worst natural disaster in Paducah's history and elsewhere in the Ohio Valley. The earthen levee was ineffective against this flood. As a result, Congress authorized the United States Army Corps of Engineers to build the flood wall that now protects the city.

Atomic City

In 1950, the U.S. Atomic Energy Commission selected Paducah as the site for a new uranium enrichment plant. Construction began in 1951 and the plant opened for operations in 1952. Originally operated by Union Carbide, the plant has changed hands several times. Martin Marietta, its successor company Lockheed-Martin, and now the United States Enrichment Corporation have operated the plant in turn. The U.S. Department of Energy (DOE), successor to the AEC, remains the owner. The plant was closed in June 2013, and the Department of Energy began the process of decontaminating and shutting down the facilities.

Quilt City
On April 25, 1991, the National Quilt Museum opened in downtown Paducah. Paducah has been part of the UNESCO Creative Cities Network in the category of craft and folk art since November 2013.

Geography

Climate
Paducah has a humid subtropical climate (Köppen Cfa) with four distinct seasons and is located in USDA hardiness zone 7a. Spring-like conditions typically begin in mid-to-late March, summer from mid-to-late-May to late September, with fall in the October–November period. Seasonal extremes in both temperature and precipitation are common during early spring and late fall; severe weather is also common, with occasional tornado outbreaks in the region. Winter typically brings a mix of rain, sleet, and snow, with occasional heavy snowfall and icing. Paducah averages 48 days a year with high temperatures at or above . Paducah is prone to river flooding from the Ohio River, which is currently ongoing as of late February 2018, with the river expected to crest at 49 feet on February 28.

Demographics

2020 census

As of the 2020 United States Census, there were 27,137 people, 11,330 households, and 5,561 families residing in the city.

2010 data
As of the census of 2010, there were 25,024 people, 11,462 households, and 6,071 families residing in the city. The racial makeup of the city was 70.99% White, 23.67% African American, 0.22% Native American, 1.02% Asian, 0.02% Pacific Islander, 1.07% from other races, and 3.01% from two or more races. Hispanics or Latinos of any race were 2.68% of the population.

There were 11,462 households, out of which 26.1% had children under the age of 18 living with them, 32.5% were married couples living together, 16.4% had a female householder with no husband present, 4.0% had a male householder with no wife present, and 47.0% were non-families. 41.5% of all households were made up of individuals, and 15.7% had someone living alone who was 65 years of age or older. The average household size was 2.09 and the average family size was 2.84.

In the city, the population was spread out, with 21.8% under the age of 18, 8.0% from 18 to 24, 24.4% from 25 to 44, 27.7% from 45 to 64, and 18.2% who were 65 or older. The median age was 41.4 years. For every 100 females, there were 85.2 males. For every 100 females age 18 and over, there were 81.2 males.

The median income for a household in the city was $31,220, and the median income for a family was $42,645. Males had a median income of $36,778 versus $27,597 for females. The per capita income for the city was $20,430. About 18.1% of families and 22.0% of the population were below the poverty line, including 34.3% of those under age 18 and 12.8% of those age 65 or over.

2000 census
As of the census of 2000, there were 26,307 people, 11,825 households, and 6,645 families residing in the city. The racial makeup of the city was 72.78% White, 24.15% African American, 0.25% Native American, 0.64% Asian, 0.08% Pacific Islander, 0.55% from other races, and 1.56% from two or more races. Hispanic or Latino of any race were 1.38% of the population.

There were 11,825 households, out of which 25.0% had children under the age of 18 living with them, 36.8% were married couples living together, 16.2% had a female householder with no husband present, and 43.8% were non-families. 39.3% of all households were made up of individuals, and 17.3% had someone living alone who was 65 years of age or older. The average household size was 2.12 and the average family size was 2.84.

In the city the population was spread out, with 22.5% under the age of 18, 8.5% from 18 to 24, 26.2% from 25 to 44, 22.5% from 45 to 64, and 20.3% who were 65 years of age or older. The median age was 40 years. For every 100 females, there were 83.4 males. For every 100 females age 18 and over, there were 77.9 males.

The median income for a household in the city was $26,137, and the median income for a family was $34,092. Males had a median income of $32,783 versus $21,901 for females. The per capita income for the city was $18,417. About 18.0% of families and 22.4% of the population were below the poverty line, including 33.8% of those under age 18 and 16.8% of those age 65 or over.

Economy
Dippin' Dots, the Paducah & Louisville Railway and several barge companies have their headquarters in Paducah.

The river continues to be a prominent source of industry for Paducah. Twenty-three barge companies have their operating or corporate headquarters in Paducah. In 2017, the city of Paducah opened a 340-foot transient boat dock that provides space for transient boaters to tie up for a few hours or several nights, increasing tourism in the city.  Amenities include fuel (diesel and marine grade gasoline), water, power pedestals, and a sewer pumpout station (seasonal for water and sewer amenities).

Just outside the Paducah city limits sits one of the United States' few sites serviced by three railways, an interstate, and a major inland waterway. The site is known as the "Triple Rail Site." This site has 600+ acres (expandable to 1,000 acres) with triple rail service allowing access North, South, East, and West from a single location. It is served by Paducah & Louisville Railway (P&L), CN, and BNSF. The site has river access at the confluence of the Ohio, Tennessee, and Cumberland Rivers, just miles from the Tennessee-Tombigbee Waterway and Mississippi River. The site is zoned for heavy manufacturing. The City of Paducah and its partners are seeking economic development of the site. 

A federal National Weather Service Forecast Office is based in Paducah, providing weather information to western Kentucky, southeastern Missouri, southern Illinois, and southwestern Indiana.

Top employers
According to Paducah's 2021 Comprehensive Annual Financial Report, the top employers in the city were entities in health care, education and retail:

Several employers in McCracken County call Paducah home, although their facilities are located outside the city limits. Paducah and McCracken County jointly operate Greater Paducah Economic Development ("GPED"). GPED lists the top employers in McCracken County, several of which include employers within the City of Paducah limits, and is more reflective of the true top employer situation as perceived by citizens of Paducah, as:

Arts and culture

Art

Murals 

In 1996, the Paducah Wall to Wall mural program was begun by the Louisiana mural artist Robert Dafford and his team on the floodwall in downtown Paducah. They have painted more than 50 murals addressing numerous subjects, including Native American history, industries such as river barges and hospitals, local African-American heritage, the historic Carnegie Library on Broadway Street, steamboats, and local labor unions.

In May 2003, photographer Jim Roshan documented the painting of the Lewis and Clark Expedition mural during the America 24/7 project. One of the images was used in the book Kentucky24/7, published in 2004.

By 2008 the mural project was completed and being maintained. Muralist Herb Roe returned to the city each year to repaint and refurbish the panels. Roe is the only muralist associated with the project to have worked on all of the panels. Roe added a new mural to the project in the summer of 2010. It shows the 100-year history of the local Boy Scout troop, Troop 1. Troop 1 is one of only a handful of troops who share their centennial with that of the national scouting organization itself. The dedication for the mural was held on National Scout Sunday, February 6, 2011.

In 2017, artist Char Downs debuted the newest addition to the Wall to Wall mural program: a series of murals of award-winning quilts on the floodwall facing Park Street. Downs invested nearly 500 hours recreating Caryl Bryer Fallert-Gentry’s historic award-winning quilt Corona II: Solar Eclipse—the first quilt in the series—in her studio in Paducah’s Lower Town Arts District.

The Paducah Art Alliance has a program of Artist in Residencies to bring respected artists in to the city. In 2018 British Artist Ian Berry came and put on an exhibition to great acclaim. Ian is famed around the world with his art in denim, and fitted in with the textile art that Paducah is known for.

Lower Town Artist Relocation Program 
In August 2000, Paducah's Artist Relocation Program was started to offer incentives for artists to relocate to its historic downtown and Lower Town areas. The program has become a national model for using the arts for economic development. It has received the Governors Award in the Arts, the Distinguished Planning Award from the Kentucky Chapter of the American Planning Association, the American Planning Association's National Planning Award, and most recently, the Kentucky League of Cities' Enterprise Cities Award.

Lower Town, home of the Artist Relocation Program, is the oldest neighborhood in Paducah. As retail commerce moved toward the outskirts of the city, efforts were made to preserve the architectural character, and historic Victorian structures were restored in the older parts of the city. The artists' housing program contributed to that effort and became a catalyst for revitalizing the downtown area. The Luther F. Carson Center for the Performing Arts was completed in downtown Paducah in 2004.

UNESCO Creative City 
On November 21, 2013, Paducah was designated by UNESCO as a Creative City of Crafts and Folk Art. Arts and cultural initiatives have included the Lower Town Artist Relocation program, the National Quilt Museum, Paducah "Wall to Wall" floodwall murals, and the Paducah School of Art and Design.  Participation in the program has been criticized by local business owners and by Paducah's economic development council due to the financial cost to the city, and because the "UNESCO Creative Cities Network only benefits a small portion of Paducah's economy".

Music 
The Luther F. Carson Center for the Performing Arts was completed in downtown Paducah in 2004. From Crosby, Stills & Nash to Garrison Keillor, Shanghai Circus to STOMP, the Carson Center hosts touring Broadway productions, well-known entertainers, dramas, dance and popular faith-based and family series.

In September 2004, plans came together to highlight Paducah's musical roots through the redevelopment of the southern side of downtown. The centerpiece of the effort is the renovation of Maggie Steed's Hotel Metropolitan.[28] Prominent African-American musicians such as Louis Armstrong, Duke Ellington, Cab Calloway, Chick Webb's orchestra, B.B. King, Bobby "Blue" Bland, Ike and Tina Turner and other R & B and blues legends have performed here as part of what has become known as the "Chitlin' Circuit". Supporters want to promote Paducah's role in the history of American music.

Paducah is the birthplace and residence of musicians in various genres. Rockabilly Hall of Fame artists Ray Smith, whose recording of "Rockin' Little Angel" was a hit in 1960, and Stanley Walker, who played guitar for Ray Smith and others, grew up in Paducah. Terry Mike Jeffrey, an Emmy-nominated songwriter, is a resident of Paducah. Nashville, TN based composer/violinist, Mark Evitts, is also from Paducah. The most prominent mainstream artist is Steven Curtis Chapman, the top-selling Christian artist of all time.

Paducah is one of only two cities named in the world-famous song "Hooray for Hollywood", which is used as the opening number for the Academy of Motion Picture Arts and Sciences Awards (the Oscars). The 1937 song, with music by Richard Whiting and lyrics by Johnny Mercer, contains in the second verse: "Hooray for Hollywood! That phony, super Coney, Hollywood. They come from Chilicothes and Padukahs..."

Both cities were misspelled in the original published lyrics, though that may have been the fault of the publishers rather than Mercer. He was noted for his sophistication and the attention to detail he put into his lyrics. The correct spellings are "Chillicothe" and "Paducah".

Sports
Paducah was home to professional baseball's minor league Class D Kentucky–Illinois–Tennessee League (or KITTY League) Paducah Paddys (1903), Paducah Indians (1904–06, 1910, 1914, 1922–23, 1936–41), Paducah Polecats (1911), Paducah Chiefs (1912–13, 1951–55), and Paducah Redbirds (1935). The Chiefs competed in the Mississippi-Ohio Valley League from 1949 to 1950.

The Chiefs played in J. Polk Brooks Stadium from its opening in 1948 until the KITTY League folded after the 1955 season. Since then, the ballpark has served as the home venue for Paducah Tilghman High School and American Legion Post 31 baseball teams, as well as various special baseball games and tournaments. In recent years, Brooks Stadium hosted the Ohio Valley Conference baseball tournament (2001–2009) and the National Club Baseball Association World Series (2015 and 2016). Brooks Stadium currently is the home field for the Paducah Chiefs of the Ohio Valley Summer Collegiate Baseball League.

In 1969, the Paducah Community College Indians won the National Junior College men's basketball championship.

The Paducah International Raceway is a 3/8-mile motorsport racetrack built in 1972.

Government

Paducah operates under a council–manager form of city government. The Paducah Board of Commissioners is made up of the mayor and four commissioners elected at-large by the citizens on a non-partisan basis. The mayor is elected for a four-year term and commissioners each for a two-year term. The mayor and council select and appoint a city manager to operate the city.

Education
Paducah Public Schools operates public schools serving most of the City of Paducah. Three K-5 elementary schools, Clark Elementary School, McNabb Elementary School and Morgan Elementary School, serve the city. All district residents are zoned to Paducah Middle School and Paducah Tilghman High School.

Parts of the city and surrounding county are instead served by the McCracken County Public Schools. Concord Elementary School and Reidland Elementary/Intermediate serve students through the 5th grade; Lone Oak Elementary School and Hendron–Lone Oak Elementary School end at the third grade, with 4th and 5th grade students in those schools' attendance zones attending Lone Oak Intermediate School. Middle school students in those areas may be zoned into Heath, Lone Oak, or Reidland Middle School. The county district began operating a single, consolidated McCracken County High School on August 9, 2013. The Paducah city district did not participate in this consolidation and Paducah Tilghman High School remains separate.

Paducah is also home to two private school systems, St. Mary High School and Community Christian Academy.

Higher education
West Kentucky Community and Technical College (WKCTC) is a member of the Kentucky Community and Technical College System and is a public, two-year, degree-granting institution serving the Western Region of Kentucky. There are approximately 6,200 students enrolled at the college. WKCTC was rated as one of the top 10 community colleges in the United States by the Aspen Institute for 2011, 2013, 2015 and 2017.

There is a Paducah campus of the University of Kentucky College of Engineering located on the WKCTC campus.

There is also a Paducah campus of Murray State University, which offers approximately 20 bachelor's and master's degree programs. It has a  facility located on a  campus adjacent to WKCTC that was opened in 2014.

Public library
Paducah has a lending library, the McCracken County Public Library.

Media
Local media in Paducah includes NBC affiliate WPSD-TV, MyNetworkTV affiliate WDKA, Fox affiliate KBSI, and the regional daily newspaper The Paducah Sun; the last two are both owned by Paxton Media Group. Six radio stations are located in Paducah; half of the stations are owned by Bristol Broadcasting Company. The weekly newspapers, the West Kentucky News and The Good Neighbor, enjoy significant readership.

The bi-monthly magazine Paducah Life debuted in 1994 and continues publication today. The magazine features articles about life and residents in and around Paducah. Purchase Area Family Magazine, a monthly publication distributed throughout Western Kentucky and Metropolis, Illinois, debuted in 2003. The magazine features a comprehensive calendar of events for the Purchase Area as well as unique articles about events, organizations and activities for families in the region.

Infrastructure

Transportation

Port Authority 
 The Paducah-McCracken County Riverport Authority was established in 1964 by the legislative bodies of the County of McCracken and the City of Paducah under an equal ownership agreement. The Riverport Authority is a quasi-government agency that provides essential maritime services for the rural regions of Western Kentucky, Southern Illinois, Southeast Missouri, and Northwestern Tennessee.  The agency specializes in bulk, agricultural, general, and containerized cargoes, and operates Foreign Trade Zone No. 294.  It is the only United States Maritime Administration Marine Highway Designation on the Ohio River and the only Marine Highway port on the river that is designated for container on barge service.  The authority owns the largest flat top crane in North America.

Air service

  Barkley Regional Airport serves the area offering regional jet service to Chicago-O'Hare with two round trips daily connecting Paducah to 150 domestic and 19 international destinations. The airport is served by one commercial airline, United Express.

Interstate Highways

Current
  Interstate 24 is a four-lane freeway that routes west to St. Louis and east to Nashville. The highway has a business loop that runs through downtown Paducah.

Future
  Interstate 66 was planned to enter the city from the south and follow I-24 east to Eddyville, where it would then follow the existing Western Kentucky Parkway; however, after a Tier 1 environmental impact study (EIS) conducted by the Federal Highway Administration (FHWA) and the Illinois Department of Transportation under the 66 Corridor Study was cancelled on August 6, 2015, by IDOT, the I-66 Trans America Highway project as a whole was officially cancelled. 
  Interstate 69 will follow the route of the existing Purchase Parkway to the south and east of Paducah, joining I-24/66 about 15 minutes east of Paducah. Once completed, it will connect the city north to Indianapolis and south to Memphis.

US highways
  US 60 is a major east-west highway that runs through the Paducah business district.
  US 45 enters the city from the north via the Irvin S. Cobb Bridge from Brookport, Illinois, and runs south down to Mayfield.
  US 62 connects to Cairo, Illinois, to the west and Calvert City to the east.

Notable people 

 Charles "Speedy" Atkins, an African-American pauper whose body was mummified and occasionally put on display at funeral home until finally being buried 66 years later in 1994
 Vic Dana, Billboard Top 100 hit recording artist and professional dancer.  Popular hits include "Red Roses for a Blue Lady", "Little Altar Boy", "I Will", "More", "Shangri-La", "I Love You Drops", and "If I Never Knew Your Name." Vic Dana
 Alben W. Barkley, 35th Vice President of the United States (during the presidency of Harry Truman)
 Isaac Wolfe Bernheim, distiller and philanthropist, founder of I. W. Harper brand of bourbon whiskey and Bernheim Arboretum and Research Forest
 Susan Bradley-Cox, USA Triathlete, named USA Triathlon Grand Masters Athlete of the Year in 1997 and 1998 and was selected as Masters Triathlete of the Year by Triathlete magazine in 1997
 William O. Burch, a decorated naval aviator and triple Navy Cross recipient during who reached the rank of Rear Admiral in the United States Navy.
 Julian Carroll, former Governor of Kentucky, member of Kentucky House of Representatives and Kentucky Senate
 Sam Champion, television weatherman and managing editor of The Weather Channel
 Steven Curtis Chapman, Christian music singer-songwriter, record producer, actor, author, and social activist
 Joseph "'Jumpin' Joe" Clifton, Navy officer who served in World War II and rose to rank of Rear Admiral
 Irvin S. Cobb, author, screenwriter and humorist, anti-Prohibition campaigner
 Russ Cochran, professional golfer on Champions Tour, previously on PGA Tour and Nationwide Tour
 Jerry Crutchfield, country and pop music producer and songwriter 
 Pierre DuMaine, Roman Catholic bishop
 Edwin E. Ellis, U.S. Navy photographer who visually documented Antarctica, inventor, businessman
 Mark Evitts, composer, string-arranger, producer and multi-instrumentalist
 Steve Finley, former baseball player, two-time All-Star, World Series champion, and five-time Gold Glove Award winner 
 Josh Forrest, former linebacker for the Los Angeles Rams
 Clarence "Big House" Gaines, Hall of Fame basketball coach, with a 47-year coaching career at Winston-Salem State University in Winston-Salem, North Carolina
 J. D. Grey, Southern Baptist clergyman influential in Southern Baptist Convention
 Robert H. Grubbs, Nobel Laureate in Chemistry for work on the organic reaction Olefin Metathesis
 Eddie Haas, Major League Baseball outfielder, coach, manager and scout
 Molly Harper, author of multiple contemporary and paranormal romance novels, including the Nice Girls vampire series and the Southern Eclectic series
 Tim Jaeger, artist
 Robert Karnes, actor, starred in television series The Lawless Years
 Callie Khouri, screenwriter, producer and director, won an Academy Award for Best Screenplay for Thelma and Louise
Brent Leggs, African American historical preservationist, founding director of the African American Cultural Heritage Action Fund (part of the National Trust for Historic Preservation)
 Kelley Lovelace, country music songwriter known primarily for his work with country music artist Brad Paisley
 Fate Marable, jazz pianist, bandleader, and player of a steam calliope
 Jeffrey L. McWaters, CEO/founder of Amerigroup Corp., Virginia state senator
 Matty Matlock, Dixieland clarinetist, saxophonist, and arranger, replaced Benny Goodman in the Ben Pollack band doing arrangements and performing on clarinet
 Kenny Perry, golfer on PGA Tour and Champions Tour
 Boots Randolph, saxophonist who was a major part of the "Nashville Sound" for most of his professional career, best known for his hit "Yakety Sax", which became Benny Hill's signature tune
 Trevor "Ricochet" Mann, professional wrestler in the WWE's RAW brand
 Adelaide Day Rollston, poet and author
 Gene Roof, former Major League Baseball outfielder and coach
 Phil Roof, former Major League Baseball catcher for Kansas City/Oakland Athletics and Minnesota Twins, bullpen coach for several MLB teams, and minor league team manager
 Jeri Ryan, actress known for work on the television series Star Trek: Voyager and Boston Public; winner of 1989 Miss Illinois pageant
 John Scopes, teacher accused for teaching the theory of evolution in the Scopes Trial
 Terry Shumpert, Major League Baseball utility player for the Kansas City Royals
 Roy Skinner, former Vanderbilt basketball coach
 Ray Smith, rockabilly musician
 Josh Stewart, Major League Baseball pitcher for Chicago White Sox and in Japan for the Orix Buffaloes
 Larry Stewart, lead singer of country pop band Restless Heart
 Patsy Terrell, former Kansas state representative
 Lloyd Tilghman, Confederate general who commanded a brigade in the Vicksburg Campaign and was killed at the Battle of Champion Hill
 Emma Talley, LPGA golfer, 2013 U.S. Women's Amateur champion, 2015 NCAA Division I Women's Golf Championship champion
 Paul Twitchell, founder of religious movement known as Eckankar
 Marcy Walker (also known as Marcy Smith), minister and former actress known for television appearances on daytime soap operas
 Robert McDaniel Webb (known as Danny), former MLB pitcher with the Chicago White Sox
 J.D. Wilkes, visual artist, musician, author, and amateur filmmaker
 Rumer Willis, actress and daughter of Bruce Willis and Demi Moore, born in Paducah while her parents were visiting for filming of In Country
 George Wilson, former football safety for NFL's Tennessee Titans

See also

 List of cities and towns along the Ohio River
 Paducah, Texas
 WIAR (Kentucky)

References

External links

 
 City of Paducah

 
Cities in McCracken County, Kentucky
County seats in Kentucky
Kentucky placenames of Native American origin
Kentucky populated places on the Ohio River
Kentucky populated places on the Tennessee River
Cities in Kentucky